The 18th Logistics Battalion is a logistics battalion in the Land Component of the Belgian Armed Forces.

Logistics Battalion, 18
Military logistics of Belgium